Paulinus the Deacon, also Paulinus of Milan was the notary of Ambrose of Milan, and his biographer. His work is the only life of Ambrose based on a contemporary account, and was written at the request of Augustine of Hippo; it is dated to 422 AD.

Against the Pelagians

In Carthage in 411 he had opposed Caelestius, a Pelagian. The formal proceedings were described by Augustine in On Original Sin. Paulinus set up six theses defining Pelagian views as heresy; Caelestius gave up on becoming a presbyter in Carthage, instead he moved to Ephesus 

Paulinus was summoned to Rome in 417, to justify himself. With local backing, he declined to appear before Pope Zosimus; in 418 the Pope took into account the measure of support for the anti-Pelagian position, and condemned both Caelestus and Pelagius.

Notes

References
Mary Simplicia Kaniecka (1928), Vita sancti Ambrosii, mediolanensis episcopi, a Paulino eius notario ad beatum Augustinum conscripta
M. Pellegrino (editor) (1961), Paolino di Milano, Vita di S. Ambrogio
Émilien Lamirande, Paulin de Milan et la "Vita Ambrosii": Aspects de la religion sous le Bas-Empire

External links

5th-century Christian clergy
Christian hagiographers
Notaries
5th-century Latin writers
Deacons
5th-century Romans